Shahrasti is an upazila of Chandpur District in the Division of Chittagong, Bangladesh.

Geography
It has 31,212 households and a total area of 154.83 km2.

It is the south-easternmost upazila of Chandpur District that has borders with Comilla, Laxmipur and Noakhali districts.

River
"Dakatia" is the main river of this upazila.

Demographics
According to the 1991 Bangladesh census, Shahrasti had a population of 180,643. Males constituted 48.59% of the population, and females 51.41%. The population aged 18 or over was 84,718. Shahrasti had an average literacy rate of 43% (7+ years), against the national average of 32.4%.

Economy
The main occupation is agriculture.

Administration
Shahrasti Upazila is divided into Shahrasti Municipality and ten union parishads: Dakshin Meher, Dakshin Raysree, Dakshin Suchipara, Dakshin Tamta, East Chitoshi, Uttar Meher, Uttar Raysree, Uttar Suchipara, Uttar Tamta, and West Chitoshi. The union parishads are subdivided into 152 mauzas and 163 villages.

Shahrasti Municipality is subdivided into 9 wards and 17 mahallas.

Shirin Akhtar, 31st batch of BCS Admin, is the current Upazila Nirbahi Officer (UNO) of this upazila. She is also an upazila land commissioner & executive magistrate of Shahrasti upazila. Besides Amzad Hossain Arnob, 36th batch of BCS Administration, is the current Assistant Commissioner of Land (AC Land) & the executive magistrate of Shahrasti upazila.

Infrastructure
Shahrasti upazila has only one hospital known as "Shahrasti upazila Health Complex". The hospital has 50 beds and is operated by government. It has several Family Welfare Centers and Community Clinics at Union level.

Another Private Hospitals are
1.Shahrasti Memorial Hospital
(Meher-Kalibari, Shahrasti)
2. Shahrasti General Hospital
(Thakurbazar, Shahrasti)
3.Shahrasti Popular Hospital
(Mazarroad, Shahrasti)
4. Shahrasti Medilab Hospital
Owaruk Bazar, Shahrasti
5. Shah-Sharif General Hospital
(Bernaiya, Bazar Shahrasti)
6. Bernaiya General Hospital
(Bernaiya, Bazar Shahrasti)

Notable residents
 Nurul Islam (academic), Vice-Chancellor of Eastern University and founding chairman of the English department at Jahangirnagar University, grew up in Waruk village, where he is buried.
 Tanjimul Islam Tareq, entrepreneur and founder of Wolf Express Limited.

References

Upazilas of Chandpur District